Eriogonum arborescens is a species of wild buckwheat known by the common name Santa Cruz Island buckwheat.

Description

The stems have shreddy maroon-brown bark. They bear narrow, fuzzy green leaves at the ends of the branches, each 2 to 5 centimeters long and sometimes with edges rolled under.

The frilly inflorescences of densely clustered flowers erect on nearly naked peduncles. Each flower is only a few millimeters wide, very light pink in color, with nine protruding stamens.  The bloom period is from April to October.

Distribution and habitat 
This shrub is endemic to the northern Channel Islands of California except San Miguel Island.

Uses
This species, and most buckwheats (Eriogonum sp.), are of special value to butterflies and native bees.

Cultivation
Eriogonum arborescens is cultivated as an ornamental plant, for planting in native plant, drought tolerant, and in butterfly gardens and other wildlife gardens;  and for larger designed natural landscaping and habitat restoration projects.

See also

References

External links
  Calflora Database: Eriogonum arborescens (Santa Cruz Island buckwheat)
Jepson Manual eFlora (TJM2) treatment of Eriogonum arborescens
UC Photos gallery of Eriogonum arborescens (Santa Cruz Island buckwheat)

arborescens
Endemic flora of California
Natural history of the California chaparral and woodlands
Natural history of the Channel Islands of California
Taxa named by Edward Lee Greene
Garden plants of North America
Drought-tolerant plants
Flora without expected TNC conservation status